Roland Romanelli (born 21 May 1946 in Algiers) is a French accordionist, synthesist and composer, mainly known as arranger. During his career, he worked with Barbara, Rusty Egan, and other notable figures in popular music.  He was an early adopter of the Fairlight system.

Romanelli moved to Paris in 1966.  He was a session player on accordion and keyboards for the singer Barbara.  He soon worked for other musicians including Charles Aznavour.  In the late 1970s, he worked in the French space disco scene, and was a founding member of the popular band Space. He took up synthesizers, which helped his career grow in the 1980s.  His 1982 album Connecting Flight was also released in the US on PolyGram Records.

Discography 

Roland Romanelli / Christophe Labrèche - Concerto De Ma Paranoïa (1978) C-LAB	18-5-78
Marie-Paule Belle / Roland Romanelli / Jannick Top - B.O Du Feuilleton Télévisé Dickie Roi (1981)
Connecting Flight (1982) T1-1-9002 Polydor / PolyGram Records (US)
Roland Romanelli / Jannick Top - April Orchestra Vol. 43 (1982)

References 

Romanelli, Roland. (2010) Vingt ans avec Barbara. (Archipel, Paris)

1946 births
Living people
People from Algiers
French music arrangers
French male composers
French electronic musicians